Fred Berry (13 February 1910 – 2 January 1989) was an English cricketer. He played 47 first-class matches for Surrey between 1934 and 1939.

See also
 List of Surrey County Cricket Club players

References

External links
 

1910 births
1989 deaths
English cricketers
Surrey cricketers
People from Kirkheaton
Cricketers from Yorkshire
Minor Counties cricketers
Berkshire cricketers